Gerry Monroe (20 January 1933 – October 1989) was an English pop singer, who enjoyed brief popularity in the early 1970s.

Born Henry Morris in [SOUTH TYNESIDE, TYNE & WEAR], England, Monroe scored five Top 40 hits on the UK Singles Chart in 1970-71.  A former colliery worker, he was spotted on Hughie Green's Opportunity Knocks TV show by Les Reed, who signed him to a long-term deal with Chapter One Records. He had a high and distinctive falsetto voice, and managed to notch up chart hits for the Chapter One label, including "Sally", a song first made popular by Gracie Fields in the 1930s. Monroe's version was co-produced and co-arranged by Reed. In 1997 an album, Sally: Pride of Our Alley, was released on compact disc on the Gold Dust label. Monroe also recorded a tribute to Bobby Charlton in 1973, following the footballer's retirement, called "Goodbye Bobby Boy".

Monroe died in October 1989 at the age of 56.

Discography

Albums

Singles

Notes

See also
List of Top 25 singles for 1971 in Australia

References

1933 births
1989 deaths
English pop singers
English male singers
People from Gateshead
Musicians from Tyne and Wear
20th-century English singers
20th-century British male singers